Theresa Matauaina Fitzpatrick (born 25 February 1995) is a New Zealand rugby union player. She was a member of the Black Ferns champion 2017 and 2021 Rugby World Cup squads. She has also represented New Zealand in rugby sevens; she won gold medals at the 2020 Summer Olympics in Tokyo and at the 2018 Commonwealth Games and Rugby World Cup Sevens. She played for the Blues Women in the 2022 Super Rugby Aupiki season.

Rugby career

2016 
Fitzpatrick represents New Zealand in rugby sevens. She made her sevens debut at the 2016 USA Women's Sevens. She was named in the sevens squad for the 2016 Summer Olympics.

2017–2021 
Fitzpatrick was named in the 2017 Women's Rugby World Cup squad and was part of the winning team of the 2019 Women's Rugby Super Series.

On 3 November 2021, She was named in the Blues squad for the inaugural Super Rugby Aupiki competition.

2022 
Fitzpatrick was named in the Blues starting line up for their first game against Matatū, they won 21–10. She also started in their 0–35 thrashing by the Chiefs Manawa in the final round.

Fitzpatrick was named in the Black Ferns Sevens squad for the 2022 Commonwealth Games in Birmingham. She won a bronze medal at the Commonwealth Games.

In August 2022, she was selected in Black Ferns XV's team for the test series against Australia for the Laurie O'Reilly Cup. She made the Black Ferns 32-player squad for the delayed 2021 Rugby World Cup. She scored a try in the second pool game against Wales. Her second try came in the final pool game against Scotland. Fitzpatrick also scored a try in the Black Ferns nail-biting semifinal clash with France as they fought their way into the final.

Personal life 
Fitzpatrick undertakes medical studies at the University of Auckland. She is the younger sister of former Silver Fern and Samoan sevens player Sulu Tone-Fitzpatrick.

References

External links
 Black Ferns Profile
 

1995 births
Living people
New Zealand female rugby union players
New Zealand women's international rugby union players
New Zealand international rugby union players
New Zealand female rugby sevens players
New Zealand women's international rugby sevens players
New Zealand Māori rugby union players
Rugby sevens players at the 2016 Summer Olympics
Olympic rugby sevens players of New Zealand
Olympic silver medalists for New Zealand
Olympic medalists in rugby sevens
Medalists at the 2016 Summer Olympics
Rugby sevens players at the 2018 Commonwealth Games
Commonwealth Games rugby sevens players of New Zealand
Commonwealth Games gold medallists for New Zealand
Commonwealth Games medallists in rugby sevens
Rugby sevens players at the 2020 Summer Olympics
Medalists at the 2020 Summer Olympics
Olympic gold medalists for New Zealand
21st-century New Zealand women
20th-century New Zealand women
Rugby sevens players at the 2022 Commonwealth Games
Medallists at the 2018 Commonwealth Games
Medallists at the 2022 Commonwealth Games